Stephen Brialey (born 8 October 1963) is a British luger. He competed in the men's singles and doubles events at the 1988 Winter Olympics.

References

External links
 

1963 births
Living people
British male lugers
Olympic lugers of Great Britain
Lugers at the 1988 Winter Olympics
Sportspeople from London
20th-century British people